Warrawagine or Warrawagine Station is a pastoral lease and cattle station located between Marble Bar and Broome in the Pilbara region of Western Australia.

Description
The Oakover River borders the property, and the Carawine Gorge lies within the property boundary.

History
Warrawagine was established in 1896 and was initially managed by Frank Thompson and his wife Ceclia. The homestead was built in 1901 along with the store, workshop shed and blacksmith shop.

In 1916 the property was acquired by the Rubin family and contributed to the wool production for uniforms in both world wars.

The property was acquired by Mills in 1992 and was stocked with 460 cattle at the time. Wallal Downs was acquired in 2013 when the property market for cattle stations was at its lowest point.

In 2015 the property was owned by Robin Mills and Rob Jowett and run along with Wallal Station; Warragine is stocked with approximately 23,000 head of droughtmaster cattle. The pair have diversified and planted  of sorghum, which is being grown using a centre-pivot irrigation system.

The 2015 season was dry with the station also being hit hard by bushfires. The station also commenced earthworks to hold annual rainwater runoff for longer to help rehydrate the rangelands in the De Grey River catchment area. Surrounding properties including Limestone, De Grey and Yarrie Stations are also involved in the project.

See also
List of ranches and stations

References

Pastoral leases in Western Australia
Pilbara
Stations (Australian agriculture)
1896 establishments in Australia
Blacksmith shops